Ocean Club may mean:
Ocean Club (football club), a Gabonese football club based in Tchibanga, Gabon
Ocean Club (Atlantic City), a condominium based in Atlantic City, New Jersey